Mentzelia veatchiana is a species of flowering plant in the family Loasaceae known by the common name Veatch's blazingstar.

It is native to the western United States from Oregon and southern Idaho, south through California and Arizona, to northwestern Mexico in Baja California and Sonora. It grows in many types of habitat, from grassland to chaparral scrub, woodland, and deserts, mostly below  elevation.

Description
Mentzelia veatchiana is a branched hairy annual herb growing erect to a maximum height near 45 centimeters. The leaves are up to 18 centimeters long. The basal leaves are lobed and may be stalked. The stem leaves are sessile and generally lobed or toothed.

The inflorescence is a cluster of flowers on the ends of stalks. The bracts are mostly ovate with teeth or lobes but sometimes entire. The orange to yellow petals are generally  with red to orange bases.

The fruit is a utricle roughly 1 to 3 centimeters long which contains many tiny angular seeds.

References

External links

Mentzelia veatchiana — U.C. Photo gallery

veatchiana
Flora of Arizona
Flora of Baja California
Flora of California
Flora of Nevada
Flora of Oregon
Flora of the Great Basin
Flora of the Sonoran Deserts
Flora of the California desert regions
Flora of the Sierra Nevada (United States)
Natural history of the California Coast Ranges
Natural history of the Central Valley (California)
Natural history of the Mojave Desert
Natural history of the Peninsular Ranges
Natural history of the Santa Monica Mountains
Taxa named by Albert Kellogg
Flora without expected TNC conservation status